A corbelled tomb is a generic term given to burial tombs with corbelled roofs rather than simple slabs, which generally denote an earlier type of construction.

In Europe they include the Mycenean tholos tomb type.

Burial monuments and structures
Archaeology of death